Halvor Vreim (12 August 1894 – 6 February 1966) was a Norwegian architect who contributed to the documentation, conservation and restoration of old wooden buildings.

Personal life
Vreim was born in Bø, Telemark to farmer Gunnar Helgeson Vreim and Anne Jonsdotter Li. In 1930 he married Anna Bonli.

Career
Vreim started his career as a carpenter, and also studied theoretical and historical aspects of the profession. He was appointed at the Norwegian Museum of Cultural History from 1920, and at the Norwegian Directorate for Cultural Heritage from 1937 to 1964. He was approved as architect, and a member of the Association of Norwegian Architects  from 1936. His works include Norwegian Decorative Art To-day from 1937, Norsk trearkitektur from 1939, and Laftehus from 1940. He was decorated Knight, First Class of the Order of St. Olav in 1963. He died in Oslo in 1966.

References

1894 births
1966 deaths
People from Bø, Telemark
Architects from Oslo